Sodom is a hamlet in Putnam County, in the U.S. state of New York.

According to one account, the hamlet was so named on account of the rowdy character of its first inhabitants. A variant name was "Southeast Center", also spelled "South East Centre".

References

Hamlets in New York (state)
Hamlets in Putnam County, New York